Sittakanay Peak is a mountain in the  Coast Mountains of northwestern British Columbia. It is located 40 miles east of Juneau, Alaska and 75 miles south of Atlin, British Columbia.

References

Coast Mountains
Two-thousanders of British Columbia